Keyte is a surname. Notable people with this surname include:

 David Keyte (born 1954), British businessman and football chairman
 Greg Keyte, polo player from New Zealand
 Jennifer Keyte (born 1960), Australian journalist and news presenter
 Lawrence Keyte (born 1963), Canadian modern pentathlete
 Naomi Keyte, member of The Transatlantics